
Year 724 (DCCXXIV) was a leap year starting on Saturday (link will display the full calendar) of the Julian calendar. The denomination 724 for this year has been used since the early medieval period, when the Anno Domini calendar era became the prevalent method in Europe for naming years.

Events 
 By place 
 Europe 
 Ragenfrid, ex-mayor of the palace of Neustria, revolts against Charles Martel. He is easily defeated, and Ragenfrid gives up his sons as hostages, in return for being allowed to keep his lands in Anjou.
 Cináed mac Írgalaig, also known as "the one-eyed", becomes High King of Ireland. 

 Arabian Empire 
 January 26 – Caliph Yazid II dies of tuberculosis after a 4-year reign. He is succeeded by his brother Hisham ibn Abd al-Malik, who appoints Khalid al-Qasri as governor of Iraq.
 The Turgesh Khaganate scores a major victory over the Arabs, in the "Day of Thirst" near Khujand (modern Tajikistan).
 A Muslim fleet raids the Byzantine-ruled Balearic Islands, as well as Byzantine Sardinia and Lombard Corsica.

 Japan 
 March 3 – Empress Genshō abdicates the throne, in favor of her 23-year-old nephew Shōmu. He is the son of the late emperor Monmu, and becomes the 45th monarch of Japan.

 Mesoamerica 
 K'ak' Tiliw Chan Yopaat becomes king (ajaw) of the Maya city-state of Quiriguá (Guatemala), until his death in 785.

 By topic 
 Architecture 
 Shōmu orders that houses of the Japanese nobility be roofed with green tiles, as in China, and have white walls with red roof poles (approximate date). 

 Religion 
 Pirmin, Visigothic monk, is appointed abbot of Mittelzell Abbey at Reichenau Island, which he has founded.
 Hugh of Champagne, grandson of Pepin of Herstal, is appointed bishop of Bayeux.

Births  
 Dong Jin, Chinese official and general
 Fujiwara no Hamanari, Japanese noble and poet

Deaths 
 January 26 – Yazid II, Muslim caliph (b. 687)
 Felix, archbishop of Ravenna
 Fogartach mac Néill, High King of Ireland
 Hababah, concubine singer of Caliph Yazid II.
 Rotrude of Treves, wife of Charles Martel 
 Tonyukuk, military leader of the Göktürks (approximate date)

References